The 1897 New Zealand tour rugby to Australia was the third tour by the New Zealand national team to Australia. Ten matches were played against regional and district sides.

Touring party
Manager: I. Hyams
Captain: Alfred Bayly

Match summary
Complete list of matches played by New Zealand in Australia:

References

New Zealand tour
Tour
Tour
New Zealand national rugby union team tours of Australia